José Padilla y Gálvez (October 30, 1888 – August 13, 1945) also known by his nickname Pepe, and his screen name, Mario de Córdova, was a Filipino lawyer, politician and movie actor.

Personal life
José Galvez Padilla was born to parents Pedro Ortiz Padilla and Monica Galvez on October 30, 1888, in Quinga (now Plaridel), Bulacan. He served as a member of the House of Representatives representing the 1st district of Bulacan from 1919 to 1928 in the 5th, 6th and 7th Philippine Legislatures. Afterwards, he then became the Governor of Bulacan from 1928 to 1931, and again from 1934 to 1937.

Padilla's progeny made themselves notable in their respective fields of show business, politics and sports. Among his dozen children include actors Jose "Pempe" Padilla Jr., Carlos Padilla Sr., actresses Cristina Aragon, Pilar Padilla (wife of Gregorio Fernandez), Maria Clara Ruiz Padilla, film director Consuelo Padilla-Osorio, diplomat and actor Amado Cortez, and Casimero "Roy" Padilla Sr., former provincial governor of Camarines Norte. He is a grandfather to actor-senator Robin Padilla, BB Gandanghari, Carlos Padilla Jr., Rommel Padilla, Rudy Fernandez, and a great-grandfather to the likes of Kylie Padilla and Daniel Padilla.

Filmography
 Secreto de confesión (as Mario de Cordova)

References

1888 births
1945 deaths
Governors of Bulacan
Members of the House of Representatives of the Philippines from Bulacan
People from Plaridel, Bulacan
Jose Sr.
Members of the Philippine Legislature